Haggle may refer to

Haggle (game), a party game
Haggle (architecture) an autonomic networking architecture
Bargaining, English word meaning to haggle or to bargain

See also
 Bargaining (disambiguation)
 Dicker (disambiguation)